Lomatium observatorium is a rare species of flowering plant in the carrot family known by the common names Mt. Hamilton desertparsley and Mount Hamilton lomatium. It is endemic to California, where it is known only from the mountains of Santa Clara County, including Mount Hamilton near the Lick Observatory. It may also occur in Stanislaus County. Its habitat includes mountain woodlands on volcanic and metamorphosed sedimentary rock substrates. Described The plant to science as a new species in 1996, the plant is a perennial herb growing low to the ground, the lightly hairy herbage growing from a long taproot.

The leaf blades are up to 12 centimeters long and are intricately divided into many subdivided lobes, the smallest segments linear or lance-shaped and pointed. The blades are borne on petioles a few centimeters in length. The inflorescence is an umbel of one or more clusters of tiny flowers borne on a peduncle, which is very short or elongated, up to 20 centimeters tall.

References

External links
Jepson Manual Treatment
California Native Plant Society Rare Plant Profile
USDA Plants Profile
U.C. Photos gallery

observatorium
Endemic flora of California
Natural history of the California chaparral and woodlands
Diablo Range
Natural history of the California Coast Ranges
Natural history of Santa Clara County, California
Plants described in 1996
Taxa named by Lincoln Constance